Postal codes in Nigeria are numeric, consisting of six digits. NIPOST, the Nigerian Postal Service, divides the country into nine regions, which make up the first digit of the code.  The second and third digits, combined with the first, are the dispatch district for outgoing sorting.  The last three digits represent the delivery location. A delivery location can be any of the following; a post office facility, a rural area, or an urban area.  

The main postal head office in each region will have a postal code ending in 0001, so Garki Main HO in Abuja has the postal code 900001, Ikeja HO in Lagos has 100001, Lokoja in Kogi has 270001 and Port Harcourt has 500001. The lowest postcode is 100001 and the highest is 982002. In addition there are some postal code for some states in Nigeria, as Enugu's postal code is 400001, while Imo state's is 460001.

See also
Lists of villages in Nigeria
Nigerian Postal Service

References

External links
Nigeria Postal Service Postcode Lookup System

Nigeria